Aval Peyar Thamizharasi is a 2010 Tamil romantic drama film directed and written by Meera Kathiravan and starring Jai, Nandhagi, Dhiyana, S. Theodore Baskaran and Ganja Karuppu in lead roles. The film failed commercially.

Plot 
Siva Rao (Veera Santhanam) is a Thol Pavai puppeteer. He and his family go around villages, performing the art for his survival. He is struggling to make both ends meet.

When they land up in Tirunelveli, a rich man Chelladurai (S. Theodore Baskaran) decides to support the family, for his young grandson Jothi (Jai) loves the art and their family. Thamizharasi (Nandhagi), Siva Rao's granddaughter, is enrolled in a local school, who grows up and works hard to pass out in flying colors in her higher secondary.

Even as she gets admission in an engineering college in Pune, Jothi and Thamizharasi develop affinity for each other. Unable to leave her, Jothi rapes her, which changes her life. As a result, Jothi is forced to leave the village by his grandfather, to live with his dad. Jothi returns after a couple of years to see Thamizharasi nowhere. The rest is all about how Jothi travels from pillar to post to reach out for Thamizharasi and repents for his acts that altered her life all together.

Cast 
 Jai as Jyothi
 Nandhagi as Thamizharasi
 S. Theodore Baskaran as Chelladurai
 Veera Santhanam as Siva Rao
 Ganja Karuppu as Othappuli
 Dhiyana as Dancer
 Rama as Thamizharasi's mother
 S. S. Kumaran as Kuthoospandiraj

Soundtrack 
The soundtrack was composed by Vijay Antony, which features 9 short tracks.

Reception
Hindustan Times wrote "Kathiravan’s effort must be lauded because he is still one of the few helmers in cinema bold enough to take his camera to the countryside and capture the dying wails of India’s glorious heritage". Behindwoods wrote "The poetically shot APT unfolds leisurely, at the pace of a slow moving train and you often tend to feel like an unaccompanied passenger in a mid-afternoon train". Sify wrote "Well-intentioned in his attempts to make good cinema, Meera Kathiravan and producers Moserbaer and Blue Ocean deserve a pat on their backs for crafting a movie that will stay in your hearts . It is a welcome change from the usual mass masalas and need to be seen in that perceptive".

References

External links 
 

2010 films
Indian drama films
2010s Tamil-language films
Films scored by Vijay Antony
2010 directorial debut films
2010 drama films